Platte County School District #1 is a public school district based in Wheatland, Wyoming, United States.

Geography
Platte County School District #1 serves most of Platte County as well as a portion of southwestern Goshen County, including the following communities:

Incorporated places
Town of Chugwater
Town of Glendo
Town of Wheatland
Census-designated places (Note: All census-designated places are unincorporated.)
Chugcreek
Lakeview North
Slater
Westview Circle
Y-O Ranch

Schools
Grades 9-12
Wheatland High School
Grades 6-8
Wheatland Middle School
Grades 3-5
West Elementary
Grades K-2
Libbey Elementary
Grades K-12
Chugwater School
Glendo School

Student demographics
The following figures are as of October 1, 2008.

Total District Enrollment: 1,089
Student enrollment by gender
Male: 550 (50.51%)
Female: 539 (49.49%)
Student enrollment by ethnicity
White (not Hispanic): 992 (91.09%)
Hispanic: 84 (7.71%)
Black (not Hispanic): 6 (0.55%)
Asian or Pacific Islander: 4 (0.37%)
American Indian or Alaskan Native: 3 (0.28%)

See also
List of school districts in Wyoming

References

External links
Platte County School District #1 – official site.

Education in Platte County, Wyoming
Education in Goshen County, Wyoming
School districts in Wyoming